Walden University is a private online for-profit university headquartered in Minneapolis, Minnesota. It offers Bachelor of Science, Master of Science, Master of Business Administration, Master of Public Administration, Master of Public Health, Education Specialist, Doctor of Education, Doctor of Business Administration, and Doctor of Philosophy degrees.

The university is owned by Adtalem Global Education, which purchased the university in August 2021.

History

Walden was established in 1970 by two New York teachers, Bernie and Rita Turner, who created a program for working adults/teachers to pursue doctoral degrees. In the summer of 1971, the first classes took place in Naples, Florida, focusing primarily on school administrators. The initial classes allowed students to form dissertation topics with their faculty partners before returning to work at their respective schools while completing their dissertations. In 1972, Walden conferred its first degrees: 46 PhDs and 24 EdDs at its first commencement in Naples.

In 1979, the Minnesota Higher Education Coordinating Board licensed Walden to grant PhDs and EdDs in the state and in 1982 the school moved its headquarters to Minneapolis. In 1990, the North Central Association of Colleges and Schools accredited the University.

Sylvan Learning Systems, Inc., purchased 41 percent of Walden University in 2001, gaining a controlling interest in 2002. In 2004, Sylvan Learning Systems became Laureate Education, Inc. Former US President Bill Clinton was an Honorary Chancellor of Laureate International Universities from 2010 to 2015. President Clinton was the keynote speaker at Walden University's commencement on July 30, 2011. Jonathan Kaplan served as CEO from 2007 to 2018. Mr. Kaplan previously served three years as economic policy adviser to President Clinton.

In 2013, Laureate Education Inc. and GSV Capital, IFC, Learn Capital and Yuri Milner provided $43M in funding to Coursera to expand online education. In 2015, Ernesto Zedillo, former president of Mexico and director of the Yale University Center for the Study of Globalization, succeeded President Clinton as Laureate Education's Presidential Counselor.

In October 2016, NBC News reported that the Minnesota Office of Higher Education was investigating a spike in student complaints. NBC News further reported that former students had filed a class action suit against the school for prolonging their enrollments for years, "until they were left hundreds of thousands of dollars in debt and still short of a degree."

In September 2020, Adtalem Global Education began the process of purchasing Walden University. In August 2021, Adtalem Global Education Inc completed its acquisition of Walden University for $1.48 billion.

In May 2022, Michael Betz was appointed as the president of Walden University. Betz previously served as a partner at McKinsey & Co. and was a leader in McKinsey’s higher education and growth transformation practices.

Walden is the top granter of healthcare administration master's degrees, Master of Science in Nursing degrees, and public health doctoral degrees in the U.S., according to the National Center for Education Statistics IPEDS database.

African American student population 
Walden University graduates a high number of Black/African American students. According to the NCSES's 2020 Survey of Earned Doctorates, Walden University granted doctorates to 1,383 Black or African American students between 2016 and 2020. This was the highest number of Black doctoral recipients granted by a U.S. university during that period and represented about 37% of the 3,726 total doctoral students that graduated from Walden during that same period.

In January, 2022, the civil rights law firm Relman Colfax and the National Student Legal Defense Network filed a class-action lawsuit against Walden University that alleges that Walden engages in “reverse redlining” by targeting its advertisements to Black and female students while misrepresenting the costs and credit hours required for its doctoral degrees.

Relationship to Bill Clinton 
From 2010 to 2015, former US President Bill Clinton was an Honorary Chancellor of Laureate International Universities, Walden's former parent company. He received $17.6 million from Laureate as part of this role. President Clinton was the keynote speaker at Walden University's commencement on July 30, 2011. 

During the 2016 United States presidential election, then-candidate Donald Trump alleged that his opponent Hillary Clinton used her husband's connection to Laureate Education to launder money through grants to the institution from the State Department. However, fact checkers at The Washington Post and PolitiFact.com found no evidence that Laureate received money from any federal agency during Bill Clinton's presidency or while Hillary Clinton was secretary of state.

Institutional finances
Walden University receives more than 75% of its funds from the US government, including more than $750 million a year for graduate student loans, the largest amount for any US college. Walden University has been under "heightened cash monitoring" from the US Department of Education since 2016.

On April 8, 2016, the Minnesota Office of Higher Education (MOHE) notified Walden University that its renewal application to participate in the State Authorization Reciprocity Agreements (SARA) was rejected because Walden University did not have an institutional federal financial composite score computed by the US Department of Education (DOE). In the absence of an institution-level financial composite score calculated by DOE, MOHE viewed Walden's parent company Laureate's financial composite score, calculated based on its global operations, which does not exceed 1.5.

Academics
Walden University consists of seven colleges and one school:
 Richard W. Riley College of Education and Human Sciences
 College of Management and Human Potential
 College of Health Sciences and Public Policy
 College of Nursing
 College of Social and Behavioral Health
 College of Allied Health
 College of Psychology and Community Services
 School of Interdisciplinary Undergraduate Studies

Accreditation
Walden University is institutionally accredited by the Higher Learning Commission.

Professionally accredited programs include:
 Walden's Richard W. Riley School of Education and Leadership is accredited by the Council for the Accreditation of Educator Preparation (CAEP).
 Walden's PhD in Counselor Education and Supervision; MS in Marriage, Couple, and Family Counseling; MS in Clinical Mental Health Counseling; MS in School Counseling; and MS in Addiction Counseling programs are accredited by the Council for Accreditation of Counseling and Related Educational Programs (CACREP).
 Walden University's Doctor of Nursing Practice (DNP), Master of Science in Nursing (MSN), and Bachelor of Science in Nursing programs are all accredited by the Commission on Collegiate Nursing Education (CCNE), a national accrediting agency recognized by the U.S. Department of Education and the Council for Higher Education Accreditation.
 Walden University's BS in Business Administration, BS in Accounting, Master of Business Administration (MBA), MS in Accounting, Doctor of Business Administration (DBA), and PhD in Management programs are accredited by the Accreditation Council for Business Schools and Programs (ACBSP).
 Walden's MS in Project Management program is accredited by the PMI Global Accreditation Center (GAC) for Project Management Education Programs.
 Walden's Bachelor of Social Work and Master of Social Work is Council of Social Workers Education (CSWE) accredited, an accreditation needed to get licensed as a social worker in most states.
 Walden's BS in Information Technology is one of only a few online programs accredited by ABET, the internationally recognized accreditor for college and university programs in applied science, computing, engineering, and engineering technology.
 Walden's Master of Public Health and Doctor of Public Health are accredited by the Council on Education for Public Health (CEPH).
 Walden University is designated as a National Center of Academic Excellence in Cyber Defense Education by the National Security Agency and the Department of Homeland Security.

Unaccredited professional programs
 Walden University's PhD specializations in Clinical Psychology and Counseling Psychology are not accredited by the American Psychological Association (APA) and have not received designation by the Association of State and Provincial Psychology Boards/National Register (ASPPB/NR), which are requirements for licensure in some states. The MS and six other PhD in psychology specializations offered by Walden are not governed by APA.

Student outcomes
In 2016, Looney and Yannelis (Brookings Institution) reported that Walden University student loan debt was the second highest in the US, with 120,275 students owing $9.8 billion. While the 5-year student default rate was low (7 percent), the percentage of balance repaid on the loans was 0 percent.

Walden's 2016 three-year student loan cohort default rate (CDR) is 6.9%; the national average is 10.1% for all US institutions. A study by the American Institutes for Research (AIR) found that the average annual federal student loan amounts of Walden graduate degree borrowers is similar to the federal loan amounts of students at public and private non-profit institutions. 1.7 to 3 percent of Walden students defaulted on loans between 2005 and 2008. The average default rate at for-profit universities is 17.1 to 22.6 percent, and the average default rate for all US colleges is 8.4 to 12.3 percent. According to the US Department of Education's College Scorecard, Walden University has a 21 percent graduation rate and a median earnings range of $26,200 (lowest) and $75,700 (highest) in the first year after graduation.

Publications
Walden University sponsors several peer-reviewed and refereed academic journals.
 International Journal of Applied Management and Technology
 Journal of Social Change
 Journal of Social, Behavioral, and Health Sciences
 Journal of Educational Research and Practice 
 Journal of Social Work in the Global Community 
 Journal of Excellence in Nursing and Healthcare Practice

Alumni and faculty
According to College Navigator, Walden University has 204 full-time instructors and 2,821 part-time instructors.

Notable alumni and faculty include:
John Antonakis
Chandra Dillard
Thomas A. Drake
Monique Holsey-Hyman
Thet Thet Khine 
Jacob Lozada

References

External links
 Official website

For-profit universities and colleges in the United States
Distance education institutions based in the United States
Educational institutions established in 1970
Online colleges
1970 establishments in Florida
B Lab-certified corporations
Walden University